Rachad Bouhlal (born 26 August 1951, Rabat) is a Moroccan diplomat. He has been the ambassador of Morocco to Japan since 22 December 2016, succeeding Samir Arrour. Prior to his assignment in Japan, he was also ambassador in the United States, in Germany, and in Benelux.

He has been the ambassador of Morocco to the United States from 18 January 2012 to 2016, succeeding Aziz Mekouar.

Bouhlal attended the Mission laïque française secondary education establishment Lycée Descartes of Rabat, where graduated in 1970.

Controversy

In May 2014, it was revealed that Rachad Bouhlal tried to pressure the Project On Middle East Democracy (POMED) into stripping journalists Ali Anouzla and Aboubakr Jamai, founders of the now censored Lakome news site, of the journalistic award they had given them.  Both independent journalists were renowned for their independence and criticism of the policies of Mohammed VI.

Honours 
 Knight Grand Cross in the Order of the Crown of Belgium.
 Knight Grand Cross in the Order of Merit of the Federal Republic of Germany.

References

External links
 Ambassador's Message

Moroccan diplomats
People from Rabat
Living people
1951 births
Ambassadors of Morocco to Germany
Ambassadors of Morocco to Japan
Ambassadors of Morocco to the United States
Moroccan civil servants
Moroccan expatriates in France
Ambassadors of Morocco to Belgium
Ambassadors of Morocco to the Netherlands
Ambassadors of Morocco to Luxembourg
Alumni of Lycée Descartes (Rabat)
Recipients of the Order of Merit of the Federal Republic of Germany